Joyeuse is a commune in the Ardèche department in the Auvergne-Rhône-Alpes region in southern France.

Geography
Joyeuse lies in the historic region of Bas-Vivarais, in the valley of the Beaume, a tributary of the Ardèche.

Population

Personalities
 Marcus Jallius Bassus, Roman consul, whose tomb is near Joyeuse
 Charlemagne, founder of Joyeuse according to tradition
 Duke Anne de Joyeuse
 Cardinal François de Joyeuse
 Duchess Henriette Catherine de Joyeuse
la Grande Mademoiselle
 François Boissel
 See List of Dukes of Joyeuse

Sights
 The Château de Joyeuse is a classed as a monument historique. An earlier castle was largely destroyed and rebuilt in the 16th century. Today it serves as the mairie.
 The  Oratorian college is a monument historique. It was founded by Duchess Henriette in 1617 with the permission of Pope Paul V. It served as an educational institution until the French Revolution. It is now the home of a museum dealing with the cultivation and use of the sweet chestnut, from foodstuffs to furniture.
 The church of Saint Peter, a third monument historique, dates from the eleventh century. The church was reconstructed in the 17th century.
 The hôtel de Montravel was built between the 12th and 14th centuries although the front façade dates from 1775.
 Museums include a museum of local history, the Espace historique et légendaire, and the Maison de la caricature et du dessin d'humour, a museum of caricature.

Twin town
Joyeuse is twinned with Jupille and Vilassar de Dalt.

Gallery

See also
Communes of the Ardèche department

References

External links

 Mairie of Joyeuse
 CPPJ - Culture et Patrimoine en Pays Joyeusain
 
   Images et textes

Communes of Ardèche
Ardèche communes articles needing translation from French Wikipedia